Limnaecia piperatella is a moth in the family Cosmopterigidae. It is found in the West Indies.

References

Natural History Museum Lepidoptera generic names catalog

Limnaecia
Moths described in 1897
Moths of the Caribbean